This is a list of listed buildings in Renfrewshire. The list is split out by parish.

 List of listed buildings in Erskine, Renfrewshire
 List of listed buildings in Houston, Renfrewshire
 List of listed buildings in Inchinnan, Renfrewshire
 List of listed buildings in Johnstone, Renfrewshire
 List of listed buildings in Kilbarchan, Renfrewshire
 List of listed buildings in Lochwinnoch, Renfrewshire
 List of listed buildings in Paisley, Renfrewshire
 List of listed buildings in Renfrew, Renfrewshire

Renfrewshire